American Favorite Ballads, Vol. 2 is the third studio album by American folk singer Pete Seeger. It was released in 1958 by Folkways Records, and later reissued in 2003 by Smithsonian Folkways.

Track listing

References

1958 albums
Pete Seeger albums
Folkways Records albums